Splash! is a Chinese reality television series based on the Celebrity Splash! format created by Dutch company Eyeworks.

Chinese reality television series
2013 Chinese television series debuts